The Mary Kay Bray Award is given by the Science Fiction Research Association for the best essay, interview, or extended review to appear in the SFRA Review in a given year. 

Previous winners include:

2002 - Karen Hellekson, "Transforming the Subject: Humanity, the Body, and Posthumanism" (Mar/Apr 2003)
2003 - Farah Mendlesohn, Review of The Years of Rice and Salt by Kim Stanley Robinson
2004 - Bruce A. Beatie, Review of L. Frank Baum, Creator of Oz by Katharine M. Rogers (Apr/May/Jun 2004)
2005 - Thomas J. Morrissey, Review of The Shore of Women by Pamela Sargent (Jan/Feb/Mar 2005)
2006 - Ed Carmien, Review of The Space Opera Renaissance edited by David G. Hartwell and Kathryn Cramer (Jul/Aug/Sep 2006)
2007 - Jason W. Ellis, Reviews of Starship Troopers by Robert Heinlein (April/May/June 2007) and Brasyl by Ian McDonald (July/Aug/Sept 2007)
2008 - Sandor Klapcsik, Rewired (Spring 2008)
2009 - Ritch Calvin, "Mundane SF 101" (Summer 2009).
2010 - Alfredo Suppia, "Southern Portable Panic: Federico Álvarez’s Ataque de Pánico!" (Spring 2010)

Academic science fiction awards
Awards established in 2002
2002 establishments in the United States